Thanedaar is a 1990 Indian Hindi-language action film, produced by Sanjay Ray, Sudhir Roy under the Shiva Arts International banner and directed by Raj N. Sippy. It stars Jeetendra, Jaya Prada, Sanjay Dutt, Madhuri Dixit  and music composed by Bappi Lahiri. The film is perhaps most remembered for the hit song Tamma Tamma Loge and its quirky dancing moves. It was 23rd time that Jeetendra and Jaya Prada paired together and the third pairing of Dutt and Dixit, who went on to star in 7 films together including big box office blockbusters Saajan (1991) and Khalnayak (1993). Thanedaar was the fourth highest-grossing film of 1990. The film is a remake of Tamil movie Anbukku Naan Adimai (1980).

Plot
The film begins in a village Jaalkot where a beast Thakur Azghar Singh is the tyrant of the region. Inspector Jagdish Chandra strongly opposes his cruelties when Azghar conspires to eliminate him with two professional killers Lawrence & Peter. Jagdish lives with his motherless children Avinash & Brijesh / Birju. One night, the killers slay Jagdish and abduct Briju whereas Avinash is adopted by a Police Commissioner. Years roll by, and Avinash becomes stout-hearted and leads a delightful life with his wife Sudha and daughter Bubbly. Briju under the nurture of Lawrence & Peter turns as notorious who is misused as their handgun. Now, they assign a final task to shoplift a jewel. In tandem, like destiny, Chanda a victim of Azghar chases Briju for aid in destroying him. Exploiting it, Briju accompanies his robbery and flees but Chanda is apprehended. Through Chanda, Avinash learns about Azghar and recollects the past. Thus, he deliberately transfers and moves to Jaalkot. Besides, Lawrence & Peter betray Briju when he wallops them and runs away with the treasure.

Now he starts a new journey while traveling on a train Avanish encounters him as a co-passenger and a brawl erupts. Here, Avanish recognizes Briju as his brother by his tattoo but tragically, he falls out of the train and dies. Afterward, Briju lands at Jaalkot where everyone welcomes him as Avinash. Despite being reckless and suborned to Azghar in the beginning, Briju becomes diehard after witnessing the vandalism. Surprisingly, an unknown person under the veil always shields him. Chanda also quiets looking at Briju’s honesty and falls for him. Meanwhile, Sudha reaches the village with Bubbly when Briju falsifies and handles the situation. Soon, he realizes Avinash is his brother and grieves for his sin. Eventually, he reforms Azghar’s henchmen Sunny & Mangal turn as approvers but they are slaughtered. However, Briju accumulates the pieces of evidence when Azghar recalls Lawrence & Peter who bares his actuality. Knowing it, outraged Sudha seeks to kill Briju when the man in the veil obstructs him. Then, as a thunderbolt, he is unmasked as Avinash. At last, they cease the baddies. Finally, the movie ends on a happy note with the reunion of the family.

Cast

 Jeetendra as Avinash Chandar
 Jaya Prada as Sudha Chandar
 Sanjay Dutt as Brijesh Chandar (Birju)
 Madhuri Dixit as Chanda
 Kiran Kumar as Thakur Ajghar Singh
 Goga Kapoor as Lawrence
 Tej Sapru as Peter
 Mahesh Anand as Mangal
 Satish Shah as Rangeele
 Kunika as Munni
 Paintal as Hawaldar Dukhiram
Suresh Chatwal as Jailor
 Sharat Saxena as Sunny
 Harish Patel as Hawaldar Bechare
 Viju Khote as Hawaldar Sukhiram
 Dalip Tahil as Jagdish Chandar (Special appearance)
 Sudha Chandran as Mrs. J. Chandar (Special appearance)
Vikas Anand as Vishnu, Chanda's Farmer
Mahavir Shah as Peter and Lawrence Henchman  (Special appearance)
Gavin Packard as Saudagar   (Special appearance)
 Subbiraj as Police Commissioner
 Tabassum

Soundtrack

Tamma Tamma Loge
The song became an instant chartbuster due to its quirky dance moves and lyrics. The dance steps are similar to the famous Michael Jackson song "Bad". It is well known that Dutt had great difficulty performing the dance moves, especially the famous scene with the chairs, and though he spent almost a month training, In an interview, choreographer Saroj Khan talked about the shooting the song, which took 48 takes to get okayed.

The tune was inspired by two songs from Mory Kanté's 1987 album Akwaba Beach: "Tama" and "Yé ké yé ké". There were also plans to remix the song by director duo Abbas Mustan for their film Players, but later these plans were scrapped due to there not being enough time before the release of the film.
The song was reprised for the 2017 film Badrinath Ki Dulhania, by Tanishk Bagchi.

Reception
Thanedaar was well received by a number of critics. The film scored well at the box office grossing 10.25 crore nett and was declared a superhit. It was also the fourth highest-grossing film of the year 1990.

References

External links

1990s Hindi-language films
1990 action films
1990 films
Films scored by Bappi Lahiri
Indian action films
Fictional portrayals of the Maharashtra Police
Hindi remakes of Tamil films
Films directed by Raj N. Sippy
Hindi-language action films